Grant Clark Sisson (June 23, 1885 – June 13, 1956) was an American politician in the state of Washington. He served in the Washington House of Representatives.

References

Republican Party members of the Washington House of Representatives
1885 births
1956 deaths
20th-century American politicians